The 2019–20 Liga IV Cluj was the 52nd season of the Liga IV Cluj, the fourth tier of the Romanian football league system. The season began on 6 September 2019 
The season was interrupted on 9 March 2020, after 15 rounds, due to COVID-19 pandemic. 

After three months of inactivity, on 17 June 2020, the AJF Cluj (County Football Association) announced that a promotion play-off tournament between the first 3 ranked teams (after 15 rounds) will be played to decide the county champion and the team that will qualify for the  promotion play-off to Liga III. 

The season was ended officially on 26 July 2020 and Someșul Dej was crowned as county champion.

Team changes

To Liga IV Cluj
Relegated from Liga III
 —Promoted from Liga V Cluj Viitorul Gârbău

From Liga IV ClujPromoted to Liga III —Relegated to Liga V Cluj'''
 Viitorul Soporu de Câmpie
 Armenopolis Gherla

Other changes
 Unirea Dej II withdrew from Liga IV.
 Victoria Viișoara enrolled in Liga IV on demand.
 Victoria Cluj took the place of Supporter 2.0 Cluj-Napoca, competing under this name for this season.

League table

Championship play-off
A championship play-off tournament between the best 3 teams (after 15 rounds) will be played to decide the county champion and the team that will qualify for the  promotion play-off to Liga III.The teams started with half of the points accumulated until the interruption of the regular season.

Play-off table

Promotion play-off

Champions of Liga IV – Cluj County face champions of Liga IV – Satu Mare County and Liga IV – Bihor County.

Region 2 (North–West)

Group A

See also

Main Leagues
 2019–20 Liga I
 2019–20 Liga II
 2019–20 Liga III
 2019–20 Liga IV

County Leagues (Liga IV series)

 2019–20 Liga IV Alba
 2019–20 Liga IV Arad
 2019–20 Liga IV Argeș
 2019–20 Liga IV Bacău
 2019–20 Liga IV Bihor
 2019–20 Liga IV Bistrița-Năsăud
 2019–20 Liga IV Botoșani
 2019–20 Liga IV Brăila
 2019–20 Liga IV Brașov
 2019–20 Liga IV Bucharest
 2019–20 Liga IV Buzău
 2019–20 Liga IV Călărași
 2019–20 Liga IV Caraș-Severin
 2019–20 Liga IV Constanța
 2019–20 Liga IV Covasna
 2019–20 Liga IV Dâmbovița
 2019–20 Liga IV Dolj
 2019–20 Liga IV Galați 
 2019–20 Liga IV Giurgiu
 2019–20 Liga IV Gorj
 2019–20 Liga IV Harghita
 2019–20 Liga IV Hunedoara
 2019–20 Liga IV Ialomița
 2019–20 Liga IV Iași
 2019–20 Liga IV Ilfov
 2019–20 Liga IV Maramureș
 2019–20 Liga IV Mehedinți
 2019–20 Liga IV Mureș
 2019–20 Liga IV Neamț
 2019–20 Liga IV Olt
 2019–20 Liga IV Prahova
 2019–20 Liga IV Sălaj
 2019–20 Liga IV Satu Mare
 2019–20 Liga IV Sibiu
 2019–20 Liga IV Suceava
 2019–20 Liga IV Teleorman
 2019–20 Liga IV Timiș
 2019–20 Liga IV Tulcea
 2019–20 Liga IV Vâlcea
 2019–20 Liga IV Vaslui
 2019–20 Liga IV Vrancea

References

External links
 Official website 

Liga IV seasons
Sport in Cluj County